The Jarrakan (formerly Djeragan) languages are a small family of Australian Aboriginal languages spoken in northern Australia. The name is derived from the word , which means "language" in Kija.

The three main Jarrakan languages are:
Kija (about 160 speakers)
Miriwoongic
Miriwoong (about 150 speakers)
Gajirrawoong (three or four speakers)

These are divided into two groups: Kijic, consisting of only Kija, and Miriwoongic, consisting of Miriwoong and Gajirrawoong; Dixon (2002) considers the latter to be a single language.

Doolboong may also have been a Jarrakan language, but this uncertain as it is extinct and essentially unattested.

Vocabulary
Capell (1940) lists the following basic vocabulary items:

{| class="wikitable sortable"
! English
! Gidja !! Guluwarin !! Miriwun !! Gadjerong
|-
! man
|  ||  ||  || 
|-
! woman
|  ||  ||  || 
|-
! head
|  ||  ||  || 
|-
! eye
|  ||  ||  || 
|-
! nose
|  ||  ||  || 
|-
! mouth
|  ||  ||  || 
|-
! tongue
|  ||  ||  || 
|-
! stomach
|  ||  ||  || 
|-
! bone
|  ||  ||  || 
|-
! blood
|  ||  ||  || 
|-
! kangaroo
|  ||  ||  || 
|-
! opossum
|  ||  ||  || 
|-
! emu
|  ||  ||  || 
|-
! crow
|  ||  ||  || 
|-
! fly
|  ||  ||  || 
|-
! sun
|  ||  ||  || 
|-
! moon
|  ||  ||  || 
|-
! fire
|  ||  ||  || 
|-
! smoke
|  ||  ||  || 
|-
! water
|  ||  ||  || 
|}

References

 
Language families

Non-Pama-Nyungan languages
Indigenous Australian languages in Western Australia